Stephen F. Paul (November 13, 1953 – September 15, 2012) was a physicist at the Princeton Plasma Physics Laboratory at Princeton University.  He created and patented the P-series fuels, a new, liquid, renewable, non-petroleum gasoline formulation.  He was in the process of converting an unused sludge plant in Trenton, NJ to process organic waste for fuel before he died.

He lived in New Jersey with his wife. He had three grown children.

He had a BS from Cornell University and received his master's degree and PhD from Columbia University.

See also
P-series fuels

References

External links
 Focuses on P-series environmentally safe fuel developed by the author. 
Stephen F. Paul (Princeton Plasma Physics Laboratory website)
"Stephen F. Paul Obituary - Columbia University"

1953 births
2012 deaths
Cornell University alumni
American physicists